The Wisconsin Athletic Hall of Fame honors distinguished members of Wisconsin's sports history. The Hall of Fame hosts several annual events, including an induction ceremony to honor new members, nomination luncheons, speaker series breakfasts and more. Bronze commemorative plaques honoring the members of the Wisconsin Athletic Hall of Fame, including Hank Aaron, Vince Lombardi, Oscar Robertson, Bart Starr and others, are displayed in the Wisconsin Athletic Walk of Fame promenade in downtown Milwaukee, Wisconsin.

History
The Wisconsin Athletic Hall of Fame was created in 1951 by the Milwaukee Arena (now UW–Milwaukee Panther Arena). It was created to "honor outstanding sports figures whose achievements earned them special acclaim." The Hall of Fame plaques were originally available only to paying customers at the Milwaukee Arena; however for the 50th anniversary in 2001, the Wisconsin Sports Development Corporation (WSDC) constructed a Wisconsin Athletic Walk of Fame outside of the UW–Milwaukee Panther Arena in Milwaukee so the plaques could be on permanent public display at no cost.

In 2014, the Wisconsin Athletic Hall of Fame was acquired by Lammi Sports Management, a Milwaukee-based sports marketing corporation. Shortly after the acquisition, Lammi Sports announced that Wisconsin Hall of Fame LLC will manage and control the assets related to the Athletic Hall of Fame.

67th Anniversary Class
On October 27, 2015, the Wisconsin Athletic Hall of Fame announced that Wisconsin Badgers men's basketball coach Bo Ryan and Green Bay Packers all-time leading wide receiver Donald Driver were selected for induction into the Athletic Hall of Fame's 65th Anniversary Class. The pair was inducted during a special event celebrating their careers and contributions to athletics in Wisconsin on April 30, 2016 at the UW-Milwaukee Panther Arena, the site of the first Wisconsin Athletic Hall of Fame induction event in 1951.

68th Anniversary Class 
Wisconsin Badgers Heisman Trophy winner Ron Dayne, LPGA legend Sherri Steinhauer, and Green Bay Packers Super Bowl Champion Charles Woodson were inducted as part of the 68th Anniversary Class on April 29, 2017. Bud Selig was also be honored for his efforts to advance athletics and better the community in the state of Wisconsin with the Lifetime Achievement Award. 2016 inductee and Green Bay Packers Hall of Famer Donald Driver served as the MC for the event, which again took place at the UW-Milwaukee Panther Arena.

69th Anniversary Class 
Wisconsin Golf Contributor Herbert Kohler Jr., Milwaukee Bucks Legend Marques Johnson and Green Bay Packers General Manager and Pro Football Hall of Famer Ron Wolf were inducted into the 69th Anniversary Class of the Wisconsin Athletic Hall of Fame on January 24, 2019 at Discovery World downtown Milwaukee, Wisconsin.

70th Anniversary Class 
Green Bay Packers legends Brett Favre and Jordy Nelson have been selected for induction into the 70th Anniversary Class of the Wisconsin Athletic Hall of Fame on June 5, 2020, in Madison, WI. Barry Alvarez will also be honored for his efforts to advance athletics at the University of Wisconsin-Madison being the winningest coach in the schools history and bettering the community in the state of Wisconsin with the Lifetime Achievement Award. Favre and Nelson, who created so many legendary moments for the Packers over the past three decades, will join 143 of the state’s greatest athletic icons.

Inductees
See footnotes

There are 143 people inducted into the Wisconsin Athletic Hall of Fame. Inductees come from a variety of sports, including auto racing, football, basketball, water skiing, bowling, baseball, and bicycling, and various Olympic sports.

A full list of inductees, along with pictures of their corresponding Hall of Fame plaques, can be found on the Wisconsin Athletic Hall of Fame's official website: www.wihalloffame.com.

A

Hank Aaron * (1988)                           
Ned Allis (1956)
Barry Alvarez (2009)
Alan Ameche * (1967)

B

Tommy Bartlett * (2003)
Ginger Beaumont * (1951)
Fred Beell * (1972)
Dick Bennett (2007)
Ray Berres  * (1999)
Lisle Blackbourn * (1978)
Bonnie Blair (1995)
Fritz Breidster * (1979)
Terry Brennan (1981)
Junior Bridgeman (1999)
Cub Buck * (1955)
John Day Buckstaff * (1960)

C

Tony Canadeo * (1973)
Connie Carpenter (2001)
Cecil Cooper (2007)

D

Willie Davis * (1988)
Chuck Daw * (1951)
Ron Dayne (2017)
LaVern Dilweg * (1967)
Janis Doleschal (1999)
Gus Dorais * (1955)
Donald Driver (2016)
Red Dunn * (1957)

F

Brett Favre (2020)
Chuck Fenske (1970)
Jim Fitzgerald * (1999)
Harold E. Foster * (1970)

G

Jim Gantner (2005)
Don Gehrmann (1981)
Earl Gillespie * (2001)
Charles Goldenberg * (1973)
Burleigh Grimes * (1954)
Charlie Grimm * (1978)

H

Archie Hahn * (1959)
Pat Harder * (1976)
Bob Harlan (2009)
Joe Hauser * (1967)
Beth Heiden-Reid (2005)
Eric Heiden (1990)
Arnie Herber * (1967)
Bernard Heselton * (1981)
Clarke Hinkle * (1951)
Elroy Hirsch * (1964)
Diane Holum (1993)
Paul Hornung * (1990)
Don Hutson * (1951)

J

Dan Jansen (1995)
Conrad M. Jennings * (1958)
"Badger Bob" Johnson * (1993)
Mark Johnson (2003)
Marques Johnson  (2019)
Davy Jones * (1963)
Thomas E. Jones Sr. * (1953)
Addie Joss * (1951)

K

Ken Keltner  * (1970)
Leroy Kemp (2009)
Don Kindt * (1988)
Herb Kohl (2007)
Herbert Kohler  (2019)
Ed Konetchy * (1961)
Alvin Kraenzlein * (1952)
Jerry Kramer (1993)
Joseph J. Krueger * (1981)
Harvey Kuenn * (1988)
Alan Kulwicki * (1993)

L

Curly Lambeau * (1961)
Verne Lewellen * (1967)
Ed "Strangler" Lewis * (1951)
Vince Lombardi * (1976)
Fred Luderus * (1957)

M

Carl Marchese * (1978)
Hank Marino * (1958)
Shirley Martin * (1998)
Eddie Mathews * (1976)
George McBride * (1952)
Jon McGlocklin (1993)
Al McGuire * (1995)
Johnny "Blood" McNally * (1960)
Walter Meanwell * (1954)
Buddy Melges (2007)
Edward Strong Merrill * (1964)
John Messmer * (1959)
Ralph Metcalfe * (1951)
Mike Michalske * (1970)
Fred Miller * (2007)
Richie Mitchell * (1951)
Paul Molitor (1999)
Sidney Moncrief (1998)
Arlie Mucks * (1964)
Frank Murray * (1959)

N

Jordy Nelson (2020)
Ernie Nevers * (1951)
Albert Nicholas (CEO) (2009)
Kid Nichols * (1951)
Ray Nitschke * (1981)
Andy North (1998)

O

Pat O'Dea * (1951)
Jim Otto (1998)

P

Frank Parker * (1960)
Jane Pettit * (1993)
Lloyd Pettit * (1993)
George Poage * (1998)
John Powless (2009)

R

Hank Raymonds * (2005)
Vic Reinders * (1981)
Pat Richter (1988)
Oscar Robertson (1995)
Fred Roethlisberger (1990)
Harlan B. "Biddy" Rogers * (1961)
Pants Rowland * (1964)
Bo Ryan (2016)

S

Walter C. Sanger (1961)
Joey Sangor * (1967)
Dave Schreiner * (1951)
Bud Selig (2001)
Al Simmons * (1951)
Johnny Sisk * (1970)
Billy Sixty * (1970)
Warren Spahn * (1973)
Bart Starr * (1981)
Sherri Steinhauer (2017)
Christian Steinmetz * (1957)
Robert Stuckert * (1990)
Billy Sullivan * (1953)
Guy Sundt * (1958)
Judith Sweet (2009)

T

Jim Taylor (2001)
Gorman Thomas (2003)
George Thompson (2001)
Fuzzy Thurston * (2003)

U
Bob Uecker (1998)

W

John Walsh * (2005)
Mike Webster * (2007)
Reggie White * (2005)
Rollie Williams * (1960)
Ivy Williamson * (1973)
Red Wilson * (1990)
Ron Wolf  (2019)
Charles Woodson (2017)

Y
Robin Yount (1995)

Z
Robert Zuppke * (1951)

An asterisk (*) indicates a deceased member

See also
Wisconsin Golf Hall of Fame
Wisconsin Hockey Hall of Fame
Green Bay Packers Hall of Fame
Milwaukee Brewers Walk of Fame

References

External links
Wisconsin Athletic Hall of Fame official webpage (on Wisconsin Sports Development Corporation website)
Walk of Fame Inductees webpage (on Wisconsin Center District website) – sortable by name, team, sport, and year

Walks of fame
Halls of fame in Wisconsin
State sports halls of fame in the United States
All-sports halls of fame

Culture of Milwaukee
Awards established in 1951
1951 establishments in Wisconsin
Tourist attractions in Milwaukee